The Fehu rune  (Old Norse fé; Old English feoh) represents the f and v-sound in the Younger Futhark and Futhorc alphabets. Its name means '(mobile) wealth',  cognate to English fee with the original meaning of 'sheep' or 'cattle' (Dutch , German , Latin , Sanskrit ). The Proto-Germanic name  has been reconstructed, with the meaning of "money, cattle, wealth".

The corresponding letter of the Gothic alphabet is 𐍆 f, called . Such correspondence between all rune poems and the Gothic letter name, as well, is uncommon, and gives the reconstructed name of the Old Futhark a high degree of certainty.

The shape of the rune is likely based on Etruscan v 𐌅 , like Greek Digamma  and Latin F ultimately from Phoenician waw .

Rune poems
The name is recorded in all three rune poems:

Old Norwegian:

Old Icelandic:

Anglo-Saxon:

See also
Félag

References

Runes